Félix Auger-Aliassime and Hubert Hurkacz defeated Mate Pavić and Bruno Soares in the final, 6–7(3–7), 7–6(9–7), [10–2], to win the doubles title at the 2020 Paris Masters.

Pierre-Hugues Herbert and Nicolas Mahut were the defending champions, but lost in the quarterfinals to Łukasz Kubot and Marcelo Melo.

Seeds
All seeds receive a bye into the second round.

Draw

Finals

Top half

Bottom half

References

External links
Main Draw

Doubles